Nick Tilsley (also Platt) is a fictional character from the British ITV soap opera Coronation Street. He was born off screen during an episode broadcast on 31 December 1980, but made his first appearance on 5 January 1981. He was played by Warren Jackson from 1981 until 6 September 1996. Adam Rickitt took over the role on 15 October 1997 until 21 April 1999 but returned for three separate stints between 2002 and 2004 and made his final appearance as Nick on 11 July 2004. Ben Price took over the role on 21 December 2009. Price announced his intentions to leave the serial on 26 January 2017, before making his on-screen departure on 2 June 2017. However, on 23 April 2018, it was announced that Price would reprise his role as Nick, and he returned on 12 October 2018.

Nick is the first-born child of Brian (Christopher Quinten) and Gail Tilsley (Helen Worth). He is the older brother of Sarah (Tina O'Brien) and older half-brother of David Platt (Jack P. Shepherd) as well as the uncle of Bethany (Lucy Fallon) and Lily Platt (Brooke Malonie) and the grandson of Audrey Roberts (Sue Nicholls) and Ivy Tilsley (Lynne Perrie).

Nick's storylines have included his adolescent problems and his role in the fraught relationship between his parents, his teenage marriage to Leanne Battersby (Jane Danson) and their divorce, and his engagement to Maria Connor (Samia Smith). Since his return in 2009 his storylines have featured him remarrying and once again divorcing Leanne, his one-night stand with David's wife Kylie Platt (Paula Lane), suffering brain damage after being involved in a lorry crash which was caused by David, and his business partnership with and later one-day marriage to Carla Connor (Alison King). In late-May 2017, after a trip to the seaside with his enemies Peter Barlow (Chris Gascoyne) and Steve McDonald (Simon Gregson), he became trapped in quicksand. Since his return in 2018 his storylines have included: stealing £80,000 from grandmother Audrey, reuniting with ex-wife Leanne, going into business with Carla, opening a barber shop called A Trim Up North with brother David, using stolen money and discovering that he has a son with his ex-girlfriend Natasha Blakeman (Rachel Leskovac).

Storylines

1981–2004
Nick was born on New Year's Eve 1980. After Brian's murder in February 1989, Nick began misbehaving, but Martin Platt (Sean Wilson) proved a calming influence. In 1991, Martin, now married to Gail, adopted Nick and changed his name. Brian's mother Ivy Tilsley (Lynne Perrie) was furious and was devastated when she discovered this, igniting her feud with Gail and Martin. In order to not have a Platt name, Ivy changed her will to say Nick would inherit her house if he kept the name Tilsley. She persuaded him to become an altar-boy at St. Luke's in exchange for a place on the football team. Ivy also reported Gail to social services, saying that she was an unfit mother. Nick's relationship with Ivy caused friction with Martin. Nick began to rebel, taking up smoking and demanding to be called "Nick" rather than "Nicky". When Ivy died in 1995, she stipulated in her will that Nick would only inherit from her estate if he changed his surname back to Tilsley, which would come back to haunt Martin and Gail years later. He did so and arguments sprang up about the house, then occupied by Ivy's widower, Don Brennan, who eventually bought the house from Nick for £12,000.

In July 1996, Nick stayed at home while the rest of the family went away on holiday, but, tired of his maternal grandmother Audrey Roberts' (Sue Nicholls) fussing, he ran away and was reported missing. Upon his return, he claimed to have been living rough in London and working in a cafe. Nick's stories cause Jamie Armstrong (Joseph Gilgun) to want to run away to London; when confronted by Jamie's mother, Tricia (Tracy Brabin), Nick admits that he only lasted two hours in London and spent the rest of his time in Torquay. Gail allowed Nick to go and live with her half-brother, Stephen Reid (Todd Boyce) in Canada, hoping that it would improve his behaviour and his education.

Nick returned to Weatherfield in 1997 to study Physical Education at Tech. Gail did not approve of his relationship with troublesome sixteen-year-old Leanne Battersby (Jane Danson), but Nick and Leanne eloped and rented a room from Ashley Peacock (Steven Arnold), due to Nick's desire to live independently. While Nick was at college, his class was visited by Darren Whateley (Andy Robb), during a lecture on Criminology. When Darren described the details of the crime he had been imprisoned for, Nick realised that Darren was the man who killed his father. Wanting revenge, he wrote to Darren under Leanne's name, asking to meet. Darren agreed and, when released on parole, he visited Leanne; who was frightened and furious with Nick for putting her in danger. When Nick told Darren who he was, Darren threatened him. Nick reported him to the police and he was arrested and returned to prison for violating his parole conditions. In December 1998, Nick was short of money and started modelling for his art teacher. Leanne suspected him of adultery and confronted him as he posed in front of the art teacher. On New Year's Eve 1998, Leanne refused to attend his eighteenth birthday party and Nick was shocked to discover that she was pregnant. In April 1999, the art teacher suggested Leanne have an abortion and Nick demanded that she do so. Leanne reluctantly agreed and was upset to learn that he was telling people that she miscarried. Nick returned to Canada alone after Leanne told him that she no longer loved him.

Nick reappeared at Gail's wedding to third husband Richard Hillman (Brian Capron) in July 2002 and soon began dating Maria Sutherland (Samia Smith). She agrees to join him in Canada, but learns from Audrey that he has a girlfriend. Heartbroken, she decides not to go. Later, having been reassured, she accompanies Nick to Canada, but she soon returns, saying that Nick was not spending enough time with her.

Nick returned in September 2003 and became friends with Sarah's boyfriend, Todd Grimshaw, (Bruno Langley). After a night of conversation and bonding, Todd, who was struggling with his sexuality, attempted to kiss Nick. In May 2004, Nick was disgusted when Sarah forgave Todd.

Nick found work at the Underworld factory. When Janice Battersby (Vicky Entwistle) made fun of him, he had her sacked, but was forced to reinstate her when Harry Flagg (Iain Rogerson) reveals that he saw what Nick did. When Janice accidentally started a fire at the factory in March 2004, Nick saved her. At the hospital where Todd worked as a porter, Todd confessed to Karl Foster (Chris Finch), that he kissed Nick. Nick reconciled with Maria and they moved into No. 8, despite Gail's disapproval. Leanne returned to Weatherfield around the same time, following a chance encounter with her father Les Battersby and Steve McDonald, who were on a night out together. Angry with Maria for sleeping with her stepsister Toyah Battersby's (Georgia Taylor) boyfriend John Arnley, Leanne attempted to come between them. Having lured Nick to her flat, she sent Maria a photo of them together. Maria dumps Nick and he leaves Coronation Street, accepting a job in Nottingham.

2009–present
On Christmas Day 2009, Nick (now played by Ben Price) returns to Weatherfield. He becomes interested in buying a share of Underworld but Carla Connor (Alison King) declines his offer. He briefly meets Leanne, who has told Carla not to trust Nick but she accepts and he becomes a partner. Nick ends his partnership with Carla a few months later and decides to open a bar/restaurant, calling it The Joinery. Leanne, although disgusted initially, agrees to become manager. It is clear that Nick still has strong feelings for Leanne. Although Leanne is dating Peter Barlow (Chris Gascoyne), Nick is still in love with her and asks her to leave Peter, but despite sharing a kiss, she refuses. Eventually, Nick succeeds in seducing Leanne and they have an affair. After Leanne ends it, Nick pretends to be Peter's friend to annoy Leanne and threatens to tell Peter about their affair. In December 2010, when Peter is critically injured in a gas explosion that destroys The Joinery and the subsequent tram crash, he and Leanne marry in hospital. When Peter learns of the affair in February 2011, he forgives Leanne. In February 2012, Leanne eventually ends her marriage to Peter after his affair with Carla and reconciles with Nick in June 2012.

In December 2012, Nick and Leanne book their wedding for Christmas Day but Leanne visits Peter after he admits that he wants her back and Leanne's sister, Eva Price (Catherine Tyldesley), reveals all at the wedding causing Nick to leave. That evening, Nick confides in David's wife Kylie Platt (Paula Lane), and she reveals to him that Eva has been quietly causing trouble between him and Leanne. After a heart-to-heart, they sleep together. However, the next morning, they agree that it was a mistake. In January 2013, Nick and Leanne reconcile and finally marry, just as Kylie announces that she is pregnant. Nick encourages Kylie to have an abortion and she gives it serious thought but changes her mind after David stops her, as he wants to start a family. Nick and Kylie agree to keep quiet about their one night stand as there is a chance that David could be the baby's father. In August 2013, Nick and David are involved in a car accident after David overhears Kylie talking about her one-night stand with Nick and then begins a vendetta against Nick and Leanne. Eventually, Nick and David argued about Nick's night with Kylie. David was desperate to stop Nick from telling Kylie and Leanne everything, fearing that he would lose Kylie. Panicking, he tried to get Nick to stop the van. In the struggle, David removed Nick's seatbelt and stopped the van in the middle of the road, resulting in the van being hit by a lorry and knocking them unconscious. David only suffers minor injuries but Nick is in a coma and has an emergency operation to remove a blood clot from his brain. While Nick is in a coma, Kylie gives birth to a baby girl, who she names Lily Platt. When Nick awakes, he has a panic attack when he sees David. Later, when Nick can talk more fluently, he blackmails David to get a paternity test to see who Lily's biological father is; under the threat of telling the police and the rest of their family how the accident really happened. David acquiesces to his brother's demand and is relieved to learn that he is Lily's father. Nick later gets easily frustrated, as he has trouble with his short-term memory and is discharged from hospital with a walking stick, and moves in with Leanne so that she can look after him. On the day of baby Lily's christening, everything is revealed. The Platt family disown David, but Nick is distraught by Leanne leaving Weatherfield. The next few weeks are extremely difficult for Nick, so he is delighted when Leanne returns and wants to give their marriage another go, but struggles to cope with his tantrums and short temper. She is shocked when he lashes out at her adoptive son Simon Barlow (Alex Bain) and promptly moves in with her mother Stella Price (Michelle Collins), telling Nick that they need a bit of space, but Nick tells Leanne to stay with Stella permanently. They remain friends and business partners.

In December 2014, Nick has a fling with Erica Holroyd (Claire King). When Nick starts to think that their fling is a relationship, Erica sets him straight. She then leaves the street to look after her mother. When Erica returns, she tells Nick that she is pregnant and he decides to be there for Erica. At a pub quiz in May 2015, Erica has stomach pains and she is rushed to the hospital, where Nick and Erica learn that she has had a miscarriage. In July 2015, Nick soon starts a relationship with Carla and he helps her get help for her gambling addiction. In December 2015, Carla later proposes to Nick and Nick accepts. The next day, Nick gathers his and Carla's families together and gives her an engagement ring. In May 2016, on their wedding day, Nick finds out about Carla's one night stand with Robert and that Tracy had blackmailed her to give Robert the business. He forgives her and they marry, but he soon regrets it. He hits Robert before Carla goes on the rampage trying to knock Tracy over but accidentally hits Cathy. This causes the majority of the street to hate her, so she leaves Weatherfield for good.

In August 2016, Nick learns that Leanne is pregnant and is moving to Liverpool to be closer to Toyah. After a heart-to-heart with David, he realises that he still has feelings for Leanne. When Simon secretly phones Nick, Leanne admits that she still loves him and he persuades her to stay. Leanne later admits that the father of her baby is Steve McDonald (Simon Gregson) and Nick struggles to accept it. When the truth comes out about Steve being the father of Leanne's son, Oliver, Michelle and Nick kiss before Nick tells Michelle that he still loves Leanne. However, in May 2017, on a family day out at the seaside, Nick gets stuck in quicksand but is rescued. In June 2017, after saying goodbye to Gail, Nick gets in his car and drives out of town to start a new life elsewhere.

Nick returned in October 2018 following Leanne's involvement in a car accident. Nick remained at her bedside until she regained consciousness. Due to her being on medication, a drowsy Leanne told Nick to stay and that she loved him, but later on, when she had fully recovered from the effects of her medication, she was shocked to see Nick and asked him to leave. Even so, Nick continued to visit until Leanne told him that she could not forgive him or love him again due to what he had put her through and his absence during her lowest moments.

In May 2019, while on a Platt family holiday, David confessed to Audrey that Nick stole her money and not Lewis. Nick initially tried to deny involvement and blame the theft on their junior stylist Natalie Watkins, but decided it was the right time to finally come clean about what happened. Audrey was devastated upon finding out her grandson's deceit and slapped Nick across the face.

During 2020, the family discovers that his stepson Oliver has Mitochondrial disease, after Leanne fights for the hospital to keep his life support on, many family members begin to question her intentions, including Nick, once it becomes clear that Oliver would not get better. Nick notices his former partner Natasha whilst in the hospital, with a young boy. It is soon revealed that this is Nick’s son, Sam (Jude Riordan). When he reveals the news to Leanne, it causes a rift in their relationship, she even tells Nick to leave the flat. Eventually Leanne agrees to turn off Oliver’s life support, and he died in November 2020.

Following the death, Nick builds a relationship with Sam, whilst Leanne becomes a depressed hermit in her flat. Due to piling debt, Simon is forced to deal drugs to help his step-mother. This eventually leads to Sam seeing Simon try to set someone on fire, and running off with Simons bag off drugs in his backpack. When Nick finds out about what Sam had seen, he confronts Simon, and Leanne soon learns the truth. Leanne tried to protect Simon by taking his place and dealing for his new boss  Harvey (Will Mellor). Nick, who by this time is staying in Natasha’s flat with Sam, begins to suspect that Leanne is having an affair, however she soon informs the police of Harvey’s actions. A sting operation leads to Harvey’s arrest and after making a statement, Leanne and Simon decide to go into hiding out of fear of reprisal. At the last minute, Nick decides to leave with them, saying goodbye to Sam and his family.

On 21 April,  Sharon Gaskell makes a surprise return. It soon becomes clear that she is Harveys aunt, and that he is using her to find Leanne. She begins talking to Sam in order to find out their location through Nick. On 28 April, Sam manages to call Nick, but Nick does not reveal their location.

On 30 April, Peter is called into hospital to receive a donor liver, he tries to make contact with Simon by calling him, meanwhile Sharon informs Sam that Simon’s father is receiving a transplant, she convinces him to phone Nick to inform him of the news. Simon overhears Nick informing Leanne about Peters surgery, and he runs off to see his dad. Whilst visiting Peter in the hospital, the doctor reveals the liver is unviable. A man is then seen informing someone over the phone of Simon’s location, and when the pair are leaving, Peter overhears the man mention Simon’s surname and tells him to run, Peter is attacked whilst Simon successfully escapes back to Leanne and Nicks secret flat. Peter is then told that the attack makes him appear unstable and therefore likely not a candidate for a transplant.  When Peter is discharged from hospital, the same attacked is waiting in the car park to follow them, however Carla manages to slip away to visit Leanne and Simon to inform him that his dad is okay. Sharon later manages to find the address on Carla's phone, but when she sends the attacker to the address, it is empty. Sharon continues to find ways to track them down, eventually leading to Nick’s son Sam getting kidnapped. Nick returns to the street upon hearing the news and when Sam is safe, Nick enters a taxi whose driver is revealed to be working for Harvey. He warns Nick that if Simon and Leanne give evidence against Harvey that he would harm Sam.

Casting

The character of Nick first appeared in 1981, portrayed by Warren Jackson. In 1996, Jackson decided to leave Coronation Street to focus on his GCSEs and assumed that he would return to the role the following year after his exams were finished, but was later axed from the programme completely.

The producers decided to reintroduce the character of Nick a year later in 1997, with the character being recast and now played by Adam Rickitt. After two years of playing Nick, Rickitt decided to leave the show and left in 1999, but he returned for two short stints in 2002 and from 2003 until 2004. He appeared as Nick for the last time in July 2004.

In early 2009, it was reported that producers were discussing bringing Nick back, but Rickitt was unavailable because he was starring in Shortland Street, a soap opera in New Zealand. The producers decided to recast the character for the second time. The role went to former Footballers' Wives' star Ben Price. Commenting on the recasting, Ben Price said "I'm not playing Adam Rickitt—I'm playing Nick and Nick's moved on [with his life]. It's been five years and you move a lot over that time. I'm sure people will think he's not like 'the other Nick', but hopefully they'll think I'm bringing something better, nicer or a bit different to the show. If I'm good enough, they'll go with it, but I can't worry about it too much." Price made his on-screen debut as Nick on 21 December 2009. In July 2010, it was reported that Rickitt turned down an offer to return. In June 2011, Price signed a new one-year contract.

Development

Background
Nick Tilsley is the first-born child and only son of Brian Tilsley (Chris Quinten) and Gail Platt (Helen Worth), born on New Year's Eve 1980 and known as "Nicky". Nicky's first few years are spent in a happy home but Brian and Gail clash over Gail's desire to work and holier-than-thou attitude in her marriage, and Brian's immaturity. By 1986, Gail has had an affair with Tilsley family cousin, Ian Latimer, falling pregnant and splits up with Brian. The child, Sarah Louise (Lynsay King), is Brian's but he refuses to believe it and begins dating lawyer, Liz Turnbull. Nicky is a major issue in the relationship; Gail resents Liz spending time with him and Liz dumps Brian when she realises Nicky means more to Brian than her. Gail, meanwhile, is dating plumber, Jeff Singleton. When Brian sees Jeff and Nicky together, he snaps and kidnaps Nicky. The police set up a nationwide search, leading to a standoff between Gail and Brian at a motorway service station where Brian leaves with his son. Finally, Brian realises that Nicky does need his mother and they reconcile.

Characterisation
Nick has been described as sexy, a tease and handsome. When Nick returned in 2009, new actor Ben Price described the character as a smart businessman and always wanting control. He also stated that the character has changed a lot since 2004. "Nick's got to be a bit harder now. He's got to start running the Street and looking after his mum and start to get David into place, so I think it's good that they went with someone else."

Relationship with Leanne Battersby
Jane Danson, who plays Leanne, said she was "intrigued" by the decision to re-introduce Nick played by a different actor, Ben Price. Nick was married to Leanne from 1998 until 1999. Leanne and Nick split in 1999 and Nick started dating Maria Connor (Samia Smith). Speaking about Nick's re-introduction, Danson said it's interesting when an old character is re-introduced because even though it's a different actor, the previous baggage remains. Danson said that Nick has been involved with both Leanne and Maria and said obviously his family are there too so there is potential scope for that character. Danson said she does not know whether they will make anything of Leanne and him or not because she seems quite settled where she is. Danson revealed that there's always a possibility of revisiting it but Leanne would just wind up Nick.

In an interview with Soaplife, Price said that even though Nick has told Leanne that he still loves her, Leanne wants to be with Peter. Price added that there is always a chance with Leanne and Nick to get back together.

Relationship with Erica Holroyd
In September 2014, it was announced that Coronation Street producers had signed up former Emmerdale and Bad Girls star Claire King for a guest stint as Erica Holroyd. It was revealed that the newcomer's arrival leads to some happier times for Nick as Erica immediately sets her sights on him, leading to a fling between the pair. Producer Stuart Blackburn said: "Erica is a woman who lives life to the full. Nick doesn't stand a chance once she has set her sights on him, but he's not complaining." Speaking about the storyline for the first time, Price said: "He's copped a stunner. I think he is going to have the best time of his life. He has had a depressing few years so I think this is great for him, really. I think he is just enjoying the moment, she is perfect for him at the minute. She's light, funny, has been around a bit and she is an adult about things. He has still got issues so he is not looking for anything serious. I think he is still struggling with himself and how he feels, so I think he just wants a laugh and a bit of fun." Price also revealed that he doesn't think Nick is ready for a long term relationship at the moment saying; "I think he needs a bit of time [before a new relationship] especially after Leanne has come back to the Bistro," Price said. "It's great, he has seen what he has lost now but he is not the guy he was, so it will take a while to get back, I think." Praising the pairing, King revealed that Erica and Nick work well together as neither of them wants anything more serious; "Erica wants it to be a fling and I think he wants the same, but she's worried because it's New Year's Eve and she has to tell him that, not knowing how he really feels, Luckily he's thinking the same so it's quite a good little catch. She continued: "Perhaps because she's more mature and not a kid, she can handle just being friends with benefits. I think he's quite capable of doing that and enjoys having her around, she brings him out of his shell as well as his suits. It has been really good for both of them, so they possibly could just go on and there wouldn't be any jealousy and negative things you can get with someone that is a bit younger. They are both mature enough to handle it and to enjoy themselves sexually too." In April 2015, it was revealed that Nick would be given a huge surprise when Erica arrived back in Weatherfield and tells Nick that she is pregnant with his baby. Speaking of Nick's reaction to the pregnancy, Price said; "He's supposed to meet Carla and Erica puts her hands over his eyes which makes it a bit awkward, because he thinks she's Carla. Then he thinks great, she's a mate. When he finds out she's pregnant, it's very tricky for him. Not that he'd run away because he's always wanted a kid, it's just not the best situation. It's a shock! His reaction is that he's shocked, but he's there for her. They may not be a couple but he's there for her and she just needs to tell him what she needs. He's very practical about it." Asked if Erica wants them to bring up the baby together as a couple, Price answered; "No, she doesn't want them to be a couple. She's absolutely cool about it."

Departure (2017)
On 26 January 2017, it was reported that Nick would exit in an "explosive storyline". ITV confirmed the reports a day later on 27 January 2017. A storyline was created to build up to his departure. A special week of the episodes aired from 29 May to 2 June alongside the Britain's Got Talent semi-final just like in previous years. His final scenes aired on 2 June 2017.

Reintroduction (2018)
On 23 April 2018, it was announced that Price would reprise his role as Nick. He returned on 12 October 2018.

Reception
In her review of soaps during the first half of 2010, Low Culture columnist Ruth Deller criticised the casting of Ben Price in the role of Nick, by stating: "we're all familiar with the way characters can suffer from SORAS (soap opera rapid ageing syndrome), but this usually happens to child or teen characters, not characters in their late twenties. However, it must have happened to Nick – how else would you explain him returning to the soap ten years older than he should be? Casting a much older actor was never going to be the easiest transition, but that aside, there doesn't seem to have been an awful lot of point to his on/off return. He wasn't the most likeable character when he was in it before and he isn't particularly interesting now." In August 2017, Price was longlisted for Best Exit at the Inside Soap Awards, while Nick's quicksand accident was longlisted for Best Show-Stopper. Neither nominations progressed to the viewer-voted shortlist.

See also
List of soap opera villains

References

Bibliography

External links
Nick Tilsley at itv.com

Coronation Street characters
Crossover characters in television
Fictional businesspeople
Television characters introduced in 1981
Fictional criminals in soap operas
Fictional con artists
Fictional characters with neurological or psychological disorders
Male villains
Male characters in television
Child characters in television
Teenage characters in television
Fictional prisoners and detainees